River Heights was an American paperback spinoff series (1989-1992) from the Nancy Drew Files series of mystery stories for preteen girl readers published by Simon & Schuster. Due to a scene in the epilogue to the first book, Love Times Three, River Heights also connects the entire Files-Casefiles continuity (which includes the Nancy Drew Files, The Hardy Boys Casefiles, A Nancy Drew and Hardy Boys SuperMystery'88, The Tom Swift Series (Archway) & A Hardy Boys and Tom Swift Ultra Thriller) into the same continuity as the Nancy Drew Mystery Stories.  The connection is that Nikki spots the clock in Nancy's bedroom and remembers that Nancy had been given that clock for solving her first mystery, The Secret Of The Old Clock. The pilot story for this series was Nancy Drew Files #39 ‘’The Suspect Next Door’’.  This series (also credited to Carolyn Keene) involved Nancy's neighbor, Nicki Masters, and revolved around Nicki's friends and rivals at River Heights High School. 

Notable among the characters beside Nikki include her arch-rival, Brittany Tate, a popular newspaper reporter; her two friends, wealthy Kim Bishop and transplanted southerner, Samantha Daley (Samantha and Brittany later become rivals); Nikki's boyfriend, Tim Cooper, whom Brittany wants as well; Jeremy Pratt, a stuck-up rich boy who falls for Kim and softens her somewhat. Others include Ellen Ming, Madge Pouchard; Karen Jacobs and Nikki's best friend, Lacey Dupree among many others. 

These books, unlike the originals, were mostly romance books. The series lasted for a short time, consisting of 16 volumes and a "Super Sizzler" special edition. Nancy Drew makes cameos throughout the series.

Titles

The Suspect Next Door (Nancy Drew Files #39)
 Love Times Three
 Guilty Secrets
 Going too Far
 Stolen Kisses
 Between the Lines
 Lessons in Love
 Cheating Hearts
 The Trouble with Love
 Lies and Whispers
 Mixed Emotions
 Broken Hearts
 Hard to Handle
 A Mind of Her Own
 Love and Games
 Friends and Rivals
 The Jealousy Trap

Super Sizzler #1: Junior Class Trip

References

 
Series of children's books